A status referendum was held in Sint Eustatius on 17 December 2014. Sint Eustatius had become a Dutch public body upon the dissolution of the Netherlands Antilles in 2010, despite this not being the status voted for, and so the 2014 referendum was supported as a way to resolve this. Although a majority of those voting opted for increased autonomy within the Kingdom of the Netherlands, voter turnout was well below the 60% required for the referendum to be binding.

Background
The decision to hold a referendum was approved by the Island Council on 8 October and supported by the United People's Party the Statia Liberal Action Movement independent MP Reuben Merkman. On 25 October the date was set for 17 December, with only the Democratic Party opposed.

Question
Voters were presented with four options:
Remain a public body
Independence
Autonomy within the Kingdom of the Netherlands
Integration into the Netherlands

Result

References

2014 in Sint Eustatius
2014
2014 referendums
Sint Eustatius
December 2014 events in North America
Multiple-choice referendums